Kim Min-ha (born September 1, 1995) is a South Korean actress. She gained international recognition for her role as teenage Sunja in Apple TV+ series Pachinko in 2022.

Filmography

Film

Television series

Web series

Variety shows

Discography

Singles

Ambassadorship
 Ambassador for the 2022 Cultural Heritage Visiting Campaign

Accolades

Listicles

References

External links
  
 
 

1995 births
Living people
21st-century South Korean actresses
South Korean television actresses
South Korean film actresses
People from Seoul